Ava Mana'o (born 27 December 1995) is an American Samoan women's footballer who plays as a midfielder for Everett Community College. She is the daughter of soccer coach Larry Mana'o and the sister of Alma Mana'o and Severina Mana'o.

Career
Mana'o made her international debut for American Samoa in the 2011 Pacific Games women's football tournament in New Caledonia. She was selected again for the team for the 2018 OFC Women's Nations Cup qualification.

Career statistics

International

References

External links
 Profile at oceaniafootball.com

1995 births
Living people
American Samoan women's footballers
American Samoa women's international footballers
Women's association football midfielders
American women's soccer players
Everett Community College alumni
People from Woodinville, Washington
Soccer players from Washington (state)
21st-century American women